The August H. Bergman House is a historic building located in Newton, Iowa, United States. Bergman was an investor in several washing machine companies, including Maytag. He was also a member of the Iowa Senate between 1922 and 1930. While there he was responsible for establishing the gasoline tax to support upgrading and paving the roads in the state. This is the only known example of a Mission Revival house designed by the prominent Des Moines architectural firm of Proudfoot & Bird. It was built by R. P. Rasmussen for $17,000 in 1909. It features a hipped red tile roof, stucco walls, stone trim, belvedere, Mission-shaped dormers, broad eaves, and a full-length single-story porch with a pergola.

The house was individually listed on the National Register of Historic Places in 1989. In 2020, it was included as a contributing property in the First Avenue East Historic District.

References

Houses completed in 1909
Mission Revival architecture in Iowa
Newton, Iowa
National Register of Historic Places in Jasper County, Iowa
Houses in Jasper County, Iowa
Houses on the National Register of Historic Places in Iowa
Individually listed contributing properties to historic districts on the National Register in Iowa